Camacupa is a town and municipality in Bié Province in Angola. The municipality had a population of 154,928 in 2014.

It lies on the Central Railway of Angola which heads inland from the port of Benguela.

References

External links 
 Camacupa city web site (in Portuguese)

Populated places in Bié Province
Municipalities of Angola